John Richard Mason (26 March 1874 – 15 October 1958), known as Jack Mason, was an English amateur cricketer who played first-class cricket for Kent County Cricket Club between 1893 and 1914, captaining the team between 1898 and 1902. He played for England in five Test matches on A. E. Stoddart's 1897–98 tour of Australia.

Over six feet tall, Mason was a right-handed batsman and right-arm fast-medium pace bowler, classified as a genuine all-rounder. Wisden Cricketers' Almanack considered him to be "one of the finest amateur all-rounders to play for Kent". Mason was chosen as one of the five Wisden Cricketers of the Year in 1898.

Early life
Mason was born in Blackheath, then part of the county of Kent, one of seven brothers and three sisters. His father, Richard, had played for Worcestershire before the county gained first-class cricket status and worked as a solicitor. His mother, Ann, was the daughter of John Eagleton. His brothers, James and Charles, both played some first-class cricket and three other brothers were also "devoted to the game", all playing for Beckenham Cricket Club.

Mason attended Abbey School in Beckenham before going on to Winchester College where he was a prolific batsman, averaging 48 and 55 in his final two years at the school. He scored 147 and 71 and took  eight wickets in one match against Eton College in 1892. He was described by Wisden in 1898, the year he was named as one of its Cricketers of the Year, as "beyond all question the finest batsman turned out in our time by Winchester College."

Cricketing career
Mason went on to play as an amateur for Kent County Cricket Club, making his debut in 1893 after leaving school in a County Championship match against Sussex at Foxgrove Road, Beckenham in July. Despite a lacklustre second season, he became a stalwart performer for the County and gave "splendid all-round service". He played regularly for Kent between 1894 and 1902, scoring over 1,000 runs each season from 1895.

He took over the Kent captaincy in 1898 from Frank Marchant, a position he held for five seasons until his career as a solicitor took precedence, although he captained the side on the field during the final month of the 1909 season when Kent won the County Championship.

Mason toured Australia in 1897–98 as part of the England cricket team's tour. He played in all five Test matches, his only appearances for the England team. Mason performed well at the start of the tour but endured "a long spell of bad luck" and did not live up to expectations. He averaged 12.90 batting and took two wickets in the Test matches, although he scored a century for the side in a first-class match against Victoria in Melbourne and averaged 39.33 with the bat in first-class matches on the tour. Mason's letters written during the tour later formed the basis of Test of Time, a book about the tour written by Mason's grandson John Lazenby.

Mason played in the four Kent County Championship winning sides of the years leading up to the First World War and played his final game for the County in 1914. He made one first-class appearance after the war, for LG Robinson's XI against the Australian Imperial Force Touring XI in 1919 at Old Buckenham Hall in Norfolk. In total he played 300 times for Kent, scoring over 15,000 runs and taking 769 wickets. His highest score of 183 came against Somerset at Blackheath while, in 1899, he posted an unbeaten 181 against Nottinghamshire in an unbroken partnership of 321 with Alec Hearne. This partnership, which was the highest in the county's history until 1934, remained a Kent record for the third wicket which stood until 2005. As of February 2018 it remains the sixth highest partnership in Kent's history for any wicket. He scored three successive centuries in 1904 against Yorkshire, Somerset and Essex and appeared 11 times for the Gentlemen against the Players.

After the 1902 season Mason's father told him he was no longer prepared to pay for his son's cricket career, and that it was time he joined the family firm. Mason played less often thereafter, but was still offered the captaincy of the English team to tour South Africa in 1905–06. He declined, and Pelham Warner captained the team.

Style of play

With a height of over six feet, Mason generally played forward when batting, driving cleanly and powerfully. His Wisden obituary describes his batting style as "so straight a bat that he was always worth watching". He was equally at home on slow, turning wickets and he averaged 33.27 in first-class cricket. Mason was also an accomplished fast-medium paced bowler and was considered an excellent slip fielder.

Military service
Despite being over the age for compulsory military service at the start of World War I, Mason volunteered in 1917 for service in the Royal Naval Volunteer Reserve (RNVR). He was commissioned as a sub-lieutenant in the Hydrophone Service and posted first to HMS Tarlair, the service's main research and training base at Aberdour in Fife. He was posted to one of the Hydrophone shore stations at Freshwater on the Isle of Wight and, in 1918, promoted to Lieutenant. He volunteered to serve in the Royal Air Force in April 1918 but was considered too important to be spared by the Hydrophone Service which was playing a crucial role in combatting German U-boat attacks. He was demobilised in January 1919.

Later life
Mason's career was as a solicitor, working at Mason and Co in High Holborn in London. Like many amateur cricketers of the time, the time required for his profession reduced his playing time but he remained involved with Kent cricket until he moved away from the county in 1939. He was a member of the county's General Committee from 1919 and served as the club's president in 1938. He played for and was involved in the Band of Brothers club, closely associated with Kent's county team. He died at his home in Cooden Beach in Sussex in 1958 aged 84.

References

External links
 

1874 births
1958 deaths
England Test cricketers
Military personnel from Kent
English cricketers
Kent cricketers
Kent cricket captains
Wisden Cricketers of the Year
Gentlemen cricketers
Marylebone Cricket Club cricketers
North v South cricketers
L. G. Robinson's XI cricketers
A. E. Stoddart's XI cricketers
A. J. Webbe's XI cricketers
Royal Naval Volunteer Reserve personnel of World War I
Royal Navy officers of World War I